KZYR (97.7 FM, "The Zephyr") is a radio station broadcasting an Alternative Rock music format. Licensed to Avon, Colorado, United States, the station is currently owned by Steve Leigh, through licensee KNS Broadcasting, LLC.

History
KZYR signed on at 103.1 MHz in 1984 as "Brave New World". It was the fourth radio station in the Eagle Valley, with studios in the Benchmark Building in Avon. The station was programmed with an early form of adult album alternative known as "adult album rock". The "Dead Air" feature once drew an interesting letter from Jerry Garcia of the Grateful Dead on letterhead of his appreciation for the recognition.
Several changes of ownership occurred in the late 1980s and early 1990s, with Jerrell K. Davis consolidating control in 1991; Gardiner Broadcast Partners bought the station not long after and became Rocky Mountain Radio in 1994. During this time, the station shifted to alternative rock as "The Mountain". In the winter of 2001, the station's new owners—Cool Radio, LLC—moved the station from 103.1 FM to its new home at 97.7 and relaunched it as The Zephyr.

In 2017, Cool Radio sold KZYR and KKVM 104.7 in Vail to Rocky Mountain Radio Group, LLC, for $1 million.
In 2021, KZYR Morning Host Steve Leigh bought the station under the corporate name, KNS Broadcasting.  Leigh has been the morning show host on KZYR since 1992.

References

External links
 
 

ZYR
Modern rock radio stations in the United States
Radio stations established in 1986
1986 establishments in Colorado